Sergejs Mirskis  (born 1 January 1952), is a Latvian politician. He is a member of Harmony and a deputy of the 10th, 11th and 12th Saeima. He began his current term in parliament on November 18, 2010. He is of partial German descent.

References

External links

Saeima website

1952 births
Living people
People from Ādaži Municipality
Latvian people of German descent
National Harmony Party politicians
Social Democratic Party "Harmony" politicians
Deputies of the 9th Saeima
Deputies of the 10th Saeima
Deputies of the 11th Saeima
Deputies of the 12th Saeima